Asma Fawaz al-Assad (née Akhras; born 11 August 1975) is the First Lady of Syria. Born and raised in London to Syrian parents, she is married to the 19th and current President of Syria, Bashar al-Assad.

Assad graduated from King's College London in 1996 with a bachelor's degree in computer science and French literature. She had a career in investment banking and was set to begin an MBA at Harvard University when she married Bashar al-Assad in December 2000. She resigned from her job in investment banking following the couple's wedding and remained in Syria, where their three children were born. As First Lady, she played a major role in implementing governmental organisations involved with social and economic development throughout the country as part of a reform initiative which was halted due to the outbreak of the Syrian Civil War.

As a result of the ongoing Syrian Civil War, a conflict which began in March 2011, Assad is subject to economic sanctions relating to high-level Syrian government officials, making it illegal in the European Union (EU) to provide her with certain material assistance, for her to obtain certain products, and curtailing her ability to travel within the EU. In the UK, she is currently part of a preliminary inquiry within the War Crimes unit of the Metropolitan Police with allegations including "systematic approach to the torture and murder of civilians, including with the use of chemical weapons."

Early life and education
Assad was born Asma Fawaz Akhras on 11 August 1975 in London to Fawaz Akhras, a cardiologist at the Cromwell Hospital, and his wife Sahar Akhras (née Otri), a retired diplomat who served as First Secretary at the Syrian Embassy in London. Her parents are Sunni Muslims and of Syrian origin, from the city of Homs.

She grew up in Acton, London, where she went to Twyford Church of England High School and later a private girls' school, Queen's College, London. She graduated from King's College London in 1996 with a first-class honours Bachelor of Science degree in computer science.

Finance career
After graduating from King's College London, she started work as an economics analyst at Deutsche Bank Group in the hedge fund management division with clients in Europe and East Asia. In 1998, she joined the investment banking division of J.P. Morgan where she worked on a team that specialised in biotechnology and pharmaceutical companies. She credits her banking experience with giving her "analytical thinking" and an ability to "[understand] the business side of running a company."

She was about to pursue an MBA at Harvard University when, on holiday at her aunt's in Damascus in 2000, she was reacquainted with Bashar al-Assad, a family friend.

First Lady

After Hafez al-Assad's death in June 2000, Bashar took over the presidency. Asma moved to Syria in November 2000 and married Bashar in December of that year. The marriage surprised many since there had been no media reports of their dating and courtship prior to the wedding. Many interpreted the union as a reconciliation and sign of progression towards a reformative government as Asma grew up in the United Kingdom and represents the Sunni majority, unlike the Alawite Bashar.

After the wedding, Asma travelled throughout Syria to 100 villages in 13 of the 14 Syrian governorates to speak with Syrians and learn where she should direct her future policies. She went on to create a collection of organisations that functioned under the charity sector of the government, referred to as the Syria Trust for Development; the organisations include FIRDOS (rural micro-credit), SHABAB (business skills for youth), BASMA (helping children with cancer), RAWAFED (cultural development), the Syrian Organisation for the Disabled, and the Syrian Development Research Centre, aimed to target rural communities, economic development, disabled citizens, cultural development, and children's and women's development, respectively. Most well-known were the MASSAR centers she created, locations that functioned as community centers for children to learn active citizenship. Due to this work, she earned a spot as one of the Middle East 411 Magazine's "World's Most Influential Arabs."

Public life 

Described by media analysts as an important part of the public relations effort of the Syrian government in her tenure as First Lady, Assad was credited with taking progressive positions on women's rights and education. The United Nations Development Programme spent US$18 million to help organise a complex set of reform initiatives showing the Syrian government was working toward a more modern and progressive form of government, a key part of which was helping to create "a reformer's aura" for Assad, highlighting her participation in the Syria Trust for Development until the programme was suspended as the country descended into civil war. As a Sunni Muslim by birth, Assad's leading role was also important for the view of the Syrian government and President among the Sunni majority of Syria.

Syrian Civil War 
A serious blow has been dealt to her public image since the Syrian Civil War intensified in early 2012, as the First Lady was criticised for remaining silent throughout the beginning of the Syrian uprising. She issued her first official statement to the international media since the insurrection began in February 2012, nearly a year after the first serious protests. Also in February 2012, she sent an email to The Times stating: "The President is the President of Syria, not a faction of Syrians, and the First Lady supports him in that role." The communiqué also described her continued support for charities and rural development activities and related that she comforts the "victims of the violence."

On 23 March 2012, the European Union froze her assets and placed a travel ban on her and President Bashar al-Assad's other close family members as part of escalating sanctions against the Syrian government. Assad herself remains able to travel to the UK because of her British citizenship.

On 16 April 2012, Huberta von Voss Wittig and Sheila Lyall Grant, the wives of the German and British ambassadors to the United Nations, released a four-minute video asking Assad to stand up for peace and urge her husband to end the bloodshed in her country.

She had not been seen in public regularly since the July 2012 bombing of the Syrian Military Intelligence Directorate, leading to press speculation that she had fled the capital or the country. She made a public appearance at the Damascus Opera House for an event called "Mother's Rally" on 18 March 2013, refuting the rumours. She made another public appearance in October 2013 and again refuted rumours of her departure, stating: "I was here yesterday, I'm here today and I will be here tomorrow."

By 2020, observers noted that Assad had begun to extend her influence within the Syrian government. Her charity Syria Trust for Development had become active again, and she began to move members of said body into more influential positions. After the previously powerful Makhlouf family was ousted from the President's inner circle, leaving a political void, First Lady Assad was able to lobby for the election of activists from the charity and development sector during the 2020 Syrian parliamentary election. Nine activists consequently won seats in the Syrian parliament, all of whom were connected to her "Syrian Trust and Development" charity. As a result, she has gained a political foothold in the parliament, indicating that "she is likely to continue to play a key role in the Syrian political arena."

In March 2021, the War Crimes unit of London's Metropolitan Police opened an investigation into allegations that Assad incited and encouraged terrorist acts during the war.

"A Rose in the Desert" Controversy and retraction 
In February 2011, Vogue published "A Rose in the Desert", a flattering profile of Assad by veteran fashion writer Joan Juliet Buck. The article was later removed from Vogue's website without editorial comment that spring. Responding to media inquiries about the disappearance of Assad's profile, Vogue's editor stated that "as the terrible events of the past year and a half unfolded in Syria, it became clear that  priorities and values were completely at odds with those of Vogue." The New York Times reported that the Assad "family paid the Washington public relations firm Brown Lloyd James $5,000 a month to act as a liaison between Vogue and the first lady, according to the firm." 

In July 2012, Buck wrote another article for The Daily Beast giving an extremely critical account of Assad. In another article in The Telegraph published in August 2012, Juliet Buck harshly criticised Asma al-Assad for being compliant in the regime's war-crimes and described her as the "First Lady of Hell". Stating that the title "A Rose in the Desert" was not her choice, Buck commented on her Vogue article: "I didn’t want to write the piece. But I always finished what I started. I handed it in on 14 January, the day President Ben Ali fled Tunisia. 'The Arab Spring is spreading,’ I told American Vogue on 21 January. 'You might want to hold the piece.’ They didn’t think the Arab Spring was going anywhere, and the piece was needed for the March 'Power Issue’... On 25 February, as Libyan protesters demanded an end to Gaddafi, my piece on Asma al-Assad went online at vogue.com. They had excruciatingly titled it 'A Rose in the Desert’."

Personal life

Assad and her husband have three children. Their first child, a son named Hafez after Hafez al-Assad, was born in 2001, followed by their daughter Zein in 2003, and their second son Karim in 2004. In January 2013, Bashar stated in an interview that Asma was pregnant; however, there were no later reports of them having a fourth child.

Assad enjoys theatre, opera and visiting the cinema.

On 8 August 2018, it was announced that she had begun treatment for early stage breast cancer. On 4 August 2019, Assad publicly stated that she has fully recovered and is officially cancer free.

On 8 March 2021, during the COVID-19 pandemic in Syria, Assad and her husband both tested positive for COVID-19, according to the presidential office. They were reported to be in good health with "minor symptoms." On 30 March, it was announced that both had recovered and tested negative for the disease.

References

External links

1975 births
Living people
People from Acton, London
First Ladies of Syria
Asma
Deutsche Bank people
JPMorgan Chase employees
People of the Syrian civil war
English people of Syrian descent
Syrian Sunni Muslims
Specially Designated Nationals and Blocked Persons List
Alumni of King's College London
People educated at Queen's College, London
20th-century British women
21st-century British women
20th-century Syrian women
21st-century Syrian women